Knut O. Aarethun (born 19 January 1942) is a Norwegian politician for the Labour Party.

From 1964 he worked in the administration of the hospital in his native Lærdalsøyri.

In 1967 he entered Lærdal municipality council. He was later elected to the county council, first time in 1981. He became deputy county mayor in 1991, and then county mayor in 1995. He lost his post following the 1999 elections. From 2003 to 2007 he served as mayor of Lærdal.

References 
NRK County Encyclopedia of Sogn og Fjordane 

1942 births
Living people
Labour Party (Norway) politicians
Mayors of places in Sogn og Fjordane
Chairmen of County Councils of Norway
People from Lærdal